Freaks is the third studio album by Swedish progressive rock band Qoph, released in 2012.

Track listing

Personnel
 Rustan Geschwind - vocals
 Filip Norman - guitar
 Federico de Costa - drums
 Patrik Persson - bass

Guest musicians
 Karl Asp - saxophone, (on "Ride" and "The Devil Rides Out")

Production
Mastered by Magnus Bergman.

References

2012 albums
Qoph (band) albums